Mthangala Brian Skosana (born 5 December 1991) is a South African professional rugby union player, currently playing with the . His regular position is centre or wing.

Career

Early career
While attending St. Andrew's College in Grahamstown, he played for Eastern Province Country Districts at the 2009 Craven Week which earned him a call-up to the South African Schools team that season. His performances there lead to a move to the  academy, but he was also noticed by Australian rugby league team Sydney Roosters and he joined their academy in August 2010, alongside fellow South African JP du Plessis.

Eastern Province Kings
He returned to South Africa at the start of 2012, joining  and playing for their Under–21 team that year in the 2012 Under-21 Provincial Championship. He made eight appearances in the competition and scored a hat-trick of tries in his fifth match, a 41–3 victory over the  side.

The following season, he was included in the senior squad for the 2013 Vodacom Cup.

Later in the same season, Skosana also made his Currie Cup debut.

He made a total of ten appearances in the 2013 Currie Cup and returned to Vodacom Cup action in 2014, scoring two tries in seven appearances.

SWD Eagles

Prior to the 2014 Currie Cup Premier Division, Skosana was not one of the players in coach Carlos Spencer's plans for the competition and he joined George-based side  on a deal until the end of 2015.

References

South African rugby union players
South African rugby league players
Eastern Province Elephants players
SWD Eagles players
Living people
1991 births
Sportspeople from Johannesburg
Nelson Mandela University alumni
Rugby union wings
Rugby union centres